Newstead railway station serves the village of Newstead in Nottinghamshire, England.

Newstead was the original terminus of the Robin Hood Line when it was re-opened in 1993 by British Rail, under the Regional Railways sector. The line has since been extended to Mansfield and Worksop. Annesley, just to the north of Newstead, did not re-open.

Newstead Abbey, the ancestral home of Lord Byron is about two to three miles away and is served by this station.

Services
All services at Newstead are operated by East Midlands Railway.

On Sundays, the station is served by a two-hourly service between Nottingham and Mansfield Woodhouse, with no service to Worksop. Sunday services to Worksop are due to recommence at the station during the life of the East Midlands franchise.

References

External links

Railway stations in Nottinghamshire
DfT Category F1 stations
Railway stations opened by British Rail
Railway stations in Great Britain opened in 1993
Railway stations served by East Midlands Railway
Gedling